The following is an alphabetical (according to Hindi's alphabet) list of Sanskrit and Persian roots, stems, prefixes, and suffixes commonly used in Hindi.

आ (aa)

इ (i)

उ (u)

ऊ (oo)

ए (e)

ऐ (ai)

ओ (o)

औ (au)

अं (am/an)

क (k)

ख (kh)

ग (g)

घ (gh)

च (c)

छ (ch)

ज (j)

झ (jh)

ट

ठ

ड

ढ

त (t)

थ (th)

द (d)

ध (dh)

न (n)

प (p)

फ (ph)

ब (b)

भ (bh)

म (m)

य (y)

र (r)

ल (l)

व (v)

श (sh)

ष (shh)

स (s)

ह (h)

क्ष (kshh)

त्र (tr)

ज्ञ (gy)

ऋ (ri)

Hindi
Persian language
Sanskrit
Hindi language-related lists